Events from the year 1966 in North Korea.

Incumbents
Premier: Kim Il-sung 
Supreme Leader: Kim Il-sung

Events
 Beginning of Korean DMZ Conflict (1966–69)
 2nd Conference of the Workers' Party of Korea

See also
Years in Japan
Years in South Korea

References

 
North Korea
1960s in North Korea
Years of the 20th century in North Korea
North Korea